is a Japanese former figure skater. He has won five senior international medals, seven ISU Junior Grand Prix medals – including bronze at the 2012–13 JGP Final, and two (2011, 2012) Japanese national junior titles.

Career 
Hino won gold and silver medals during the 2011–12 ISU Junior Grand Prix series and qualified for the JGP Final where he finished 5th. He won the Japanese Junior Championships.

During the 2012–13 ISU Junior Grand Prix season, Hino won bronze in France and silver in Austria and qualified for the 2012 JGP Final in Sochi, Russia. At the final, Hino edged out American skater Jason Brown for the bronze medal. Hino won his second junior national title at the 2012 Japanese Junior Championships.

In the 2013–14 JGP season, Hino won two silver medals at his events in Mexico and Belarus. Having qualified for his third JGP Final, he finished sixth in Fukuoka, Japan. He won his first senior international medal, bronze, at the 2014 Triglav Trophy.

He announced his retirement after the 2020-2021 season.

Programs

Competitive highlights 
GP: Grand Prix; CS: Challenger Series; JGP: Junior Grand Prix

References

External links 

 

1995 births
Japanese male single skaters
Living people
Sportspeople from Tokyo
Japanese people of Russian descent
Competitors at the 2015 Winter Universiade
Competitors at the 2017 Winter Universiade
20th-century Japanese people
21st-century Japanese people